The Chemin de fer de l'Outaouais, (CFO) or the Compagnie de chemin de fer de l'Outaouais (CCFO) is a railroad that linked the city of Gatineau to Wakefield, in the province of Quebec. Before 1986 the track extended to Maniwaki.

The company is owned by the cities of Gatineau, Chelsea, and La Pêche.

See also 

 Hull–Chelsea–Wakefield Railway 
 1904 in rail transport
 Quebec Gatineau Railway

References

External links 
 Government of Canada
 Railways in Ottawa
 UP THE LINE

Quebec railways
Companies based in Gatineau
Transport in Gatineau